The Puerto Rico Department of Consumer Affairs (PRDCA) or (DACO in Spanish)— is the executive department of the government of Puerto Rico responsible of defending and protecting consumers in the U.S. Commonwealth. The Department is headed by a Cabinet-level Secretary, appointed by the Governor and subject to the advice and consent of the Senate.

History
The Department was created by Law 5 of April 23, 1973 as a Cabinet-level successor to ASERCO, or Administration for Services to Consumers. The agency has its headquarters in the North Building of the Minillas Governmental Center/Roberto Sánchez Villela Government Center in Santurce, San Juan.

Secretary

Secretaries of DACO:

 Federico Hernandez Denton - 1970's
 Javier Echevarría
 Alejandro García Padilla - 2005-2008
 Luis G. Rivera Marín - 2009-2012
 Omar Marrero - 2012
 Nery E. Adamés Soto - 2013-2017
 Michael Pierlusi - 2017- to present

External links
 daco.pr.gov - official site of the Puerto Rico Department of Consumer Affairs

References

Executive departments of the government of Puerto Rico